Haumaniastrum is a genus of flowering plants in the mint family, Lamiaceae, first described in 1959. The species are native to Africa (including Madagascar).

Species
Haumaniastrum alboviride (Hutch.) P.A.Duvign. & Plancke - Ghana, Nigeria, Cameroon, Chad
Haumaniastrum bianense A.J.Paton - Zaïre
Haumaniastrum buettneri (Gürke) J.K.Morton - central + western Africa from Zaïre to Sierra Leone
Haumaniastrum caeruleum (Oliv.) P.A.Duvign. & Plancke - widespread from Senegal to Somalia, south to Malawi
Haumaniastrum chartaceum A.J.Paton - Zaïre
Haumaniastrum cordigerum P.A.Duvign. & Plancke - Zaïre
Haumaniastrum coriaceum (Robyns & Lebrun) A.J.Paton - Zaïre, Burundi, Tanzania, Zambia, Malawi
Haumaniastrum cubanquense (R.D.Good) A.J.Paton - Angola
Haumaniastrum dissitifolium (Baker) A.J.Paton - western Africa from Burundi to Zimbabwe
Haumaniastrum glabrifolium A.J.Paton - Zambia
Haumaniastrum graminifolium (Robyns) A.J.Paton - Kibara Plateau in Zaïre
Haumaniastrum kaessneri (S.Moore) P.A.Duvign. & Plancke - Zaïre
Haumaniastrum katangense (S.Moore) P.A.Duvign. & Plancke - Zaïre, Tanzania, Angola, Zambia
Haumaniastrum lantanoides (S.Moore) P.A.Duvign. & Plancke - Zaïre, Malawi, Angola, Zambia
Haumaniastrum linearifolium (De Wild.) P.A.Duvign. & Plancke - Zaïre, Zambia
Haumaniastrum membranaceum A.J.Paton - Angola
Haumaniastrum minor (Briq.) A.J.Paton - Angola, Zambia
Haumaniastrum morumbense (De Wild.) A.J.Paton - Zaïre
Haumaniastrum paniculatum (Briq.) A.J.Paton - Zaïre, Angola, Cabinda
Haumaniastrum polyneurum (S.Moore) P.A.Duvign. & Plancke - Zaïre
Haumaniastrum praealtum (Briq.) P.A.Duvign. & Plancke - Zaïre, Tanzania, Angola, Zambia
Haumaniastrum robertii (Robyns) P.A.Duvign. & Plancke - Zaïre
Haumaniastrum rosulatum (De Wild.) P.A.Duvign. & Plancke - Zaïre
Haumaniastrum rupestre (R.E.Fr.) A.J.Paton - Zaïre, Zambia
Haumaniastrum semilignosum (P.A.Duvign. & Plancke) P.A.Duvign. & Plancke - Zaïre
Haumaniastrum sericeum (Briq.) A.J.Paton - Congo-Brazzaville, Zaïre, Angola, Zambia, Mozambique, Zimbabwe, Namibia
Haumaniastrum speciosum (E.A.Bruce) A.J.Paton - Tanzania, Zambia
Haumaniastrum stanneum A.J.Paton - Zaïre
Haumaniastrum suberosum (Robyns & Lebrun) P.A.Duvign. & Plancke - Zaïre, Zambia, Mozambique, Tanzania
Haumaniastrum timpermanii (P.A.Duvign. & Plancke) P.A.Duvign. & Plancke - Zaïre
Haumaniastrum triramosum (N.E.Br.) A.J.Paton - Angola
Haumaniastrum uniflorum A.J.Paton - Tanzania
Haumaniastrum vandenbrandei (P.A.Duvign. & Plancke) P.A.Duvign. & Plancke - Zaïre
Haumaniastrum venosum (Baker) Agnew - Uganda, Kenya, Zaïre, Zambia, Mozambique, Tanzania, Malawi, Zimbabwe
Haumaniastrum villosum (Benth.) A.J.Paton - Madagascar, from Ethiopia west to Nigeria and south to Zimbabwe*

References

Lamiaceae
Lamiaceae genera